Union County is a county located in the U.S. state of North Carolina. As of the 2020 census, the population was 238,267. Its county seat is Monroe. Union County is included in the Charlotte-Concord-Gastonia, NC-SC Metropolitan Statistical Area.

History
The county was formed in 1842 from parts of Anson County and Mecklenburg County. Its name was a compromise between Whigs, who wanted to name the new county for Henry Clay, and Democrats, who wanted to name it for Andrew Jackson. The Helms, Starnes, McRorie, and Belk families were prominent in the town as well as Monroe and Charlotte. Most of these families came from Goose Creek Township.

Monroe, the county seat of Union County, also became a focal point during the Civil Rights Movement. In 1958, local NAACP Chapter President Robert F. Williams defended a nine-year-old African-American boy who had been kissed by a white girl in an incident known as the Kissing Case. A second African-American boy, aged seven, was also convicted and sentenced to live in a juvenile reformatory until he was 21 for simply witnessing the act.

Geography

State and local protected areas 
 Mineral Springs Greenway
 Rocky River Blueway

Major water bodies 
 Beaverdam Creek (Lanes Creek tributary)
 Crooked Creek (Rocky River tributary)
 Lake Lee
 Lake Monroe
 Lake Twitty
 Lanes Creek (Rocky River tributary)
 Lynches River
 Rocky River

Adjacent counties
 Cabarrus County - north
 Stanly County - northeast
 Anson County - east
 Chesterfield County, South Carolina - southeast
 Lancaster County, South Carolina - southwest
 Mecklenburg County - northwest

Major highways
 
  (Tolled)

Major Infrastructure 
 Charlotte-Monroe Executive Airport
 Goose Creek Airport (28A)
 Jaars-Townsend Airport

Demographics

2020 census

As of the 2020 United States census, there were 238,267 people, 77,954 households, and 62,932 families residing in the county.

2010 census
As of the census of 2010, there were 201,292 people, 67,864 households, and 54,019 families residing in the county.  The population density was 194 people per square mile (75/km2).  There were 45,695 housing units at an average density of 31.4 per square mile (12.3/km2).  The racial makeup of the county was 79.0% White, 11.7% Black or African American, 0.4% Native American, 1.6% Asian, 0.03% Pacific Islander, 5.3% from other races, and 1.9% from two or more races.  10.4% of the population were Hispanic or Latino of any race.

There were 67,864 households, out of which 42.1% had children under the age of 18 living with them, 64.60% were married couples living together, and 10.70% had a female householder with no husband present. 6.10% had someone living alone who was 65 years of age or older.  The average household size was 2.94 and the average family size was 3.3.

In the county, the population was spread out, with 32.90% under the age of 20, 4.7% from 20 to 24, 27.7% from 25 to 44, 25.2% from 45 to 64, and 9.6% who were 65 years of age or older.  The median age was 36.2 years. The population was 49.4% male. Northern Union County has the southern foothills of the Uwharrie Mountains

Government and politics
In the early through mid-twentieth century, Union County was a firm "Solid South" Democratic county. Union County remained traditionally "Solid South" until after the Civil Rights Movement. The first Republican to win the county was Richard Nixon with less than forty percent of the vote in a three-way race in 1968. Following Nixon's election, the trend towards liberalism in the Democratic Party has turned Union County into a strongly Republican county since the late twentieth century. The last Democrat to win Union County was Jimmy Carter in 1980, and since then, no Democrat has won more than 38 percent of the county's vote.

Union County is a member of the regional Centralina Council of Governments.

Education
 South Piedmont Community College
 Central Academy of Technology and Arts
 Cuthbertson High School
 Forest Hills High School
 Marvin Ridge High School
 Metrolina Christian Academy
 Monroe Charter Academy
 Monroe High School
 Parkwood High School
 Piedmont High School
 Porter Ridge High School
 Sun Valley High School
 Arborbrook Christian Academy
 Tabernacle Christian School
 Union County Early College
 Union Academy
 Weddington High School
 Wingate University
 Shiloh Elementary

Events
Two major annual events occur in the county:
 Brooklandwood in Mineral Springs is the site of the Queens Cup Steeplechase, one of steeplechase horse racing's major annual events.  The program consists of several races, and is held the last Saturday of April. The schedule of events also features a Jack Russell Terrier judging contest.  Over 10,000 people typically attend the event.
 The Union County town of Marshville is the site of the Boll Weevil Festival, an annual street fair and carnival that takes place every fall.

Communities

City
 Monroe (county seat)

Towns

 Fairview
 Hemby Bridge
 Indian Trail (largest town)
 Marshville
 Mineral Springs
 Mint Hill
 Stallings
 Unionville
 Waxhaw
 Weddington
 Wingate

Villages
 Lake Park
 Marvin
 Wesley Chapel

Census-designated place
 JAARS

Unincorporated communities
 Brief
 Jackson
 New Salem
 Olive Branch
 Roughedge

Ghost towns
 Gibraltar

Townships

 Goose Creek
 Jackson
 Marshville
 Monroe
 New Salem
 Vance
 Buford
 Lanes Creek
 Sandy Ridge

See also
 List of counties in North Carolina
 National Register of Historic Places listings in Union County, North Carolina
 Brandon Oaks, North Carolina

References

External links

 
 
 Monroe-Union County Economic Development

 
1842 establishments in North Carolina
Populated places established in 1842